Episcopal High School is a four-year co-educational private day school located on a  campus in Bellaire, Texas, United States, in Greater Houston. It was founded in 1983 and had an enrollment of 800 students in the 2021–2022 school year.

History
Founded in 1983 by a group of Houston business and Episcopal Church leaders, the school opened its doors in the fall of 1984 to 150 students in grades nine and ten. The founders, led by The Rt. Rev. Maurice M. Benitez, established the School as an institution of the Diocese. To introduce the school to Houston, the founders did extensive marketing via newspapers, television, and educational publications. The founding headmaster, Rev. Warren R. "Jess" Borg, served until 1995, when Edward C. "Ned" Becker was appointed the second Head of School. After Ned Becker retired in 2007, he was replaced by C. Edward "Ned" Smith as the third Head of School.

A complete campus, with buildings in need of extensive repair, was purchased in 1983 from Houston developer Wayne Duddlesten, who had purchased the  site from the Sisters of the Incarnate Word and Blessed Sacrament. Formerly housing the Marian High School and the Congregation of the Sisters of the Incarnate Word and Blessed Sacrament, a convent and a co-ed high school, the property had been vacant for several years before Duddlesten purchased it. Duddlesten wished to build a high-rise building, but area residents complained. He instead sold the building to the developers of the school.

After 15 years of fundraising, the campus debt was retired and a $42 million campaign for new buildings and endowment was initiated. In 2001, the campaign ended with the construction of a new classroom building and library, a student center, a gymnasium, and a field house, track, and stadium complex.

In 2008 the school planned an expansion worth $50 million. It sought approval from the Bellaire city government.

In 2012, the Jack T. Trotter Academic & Sciences Building was opened. The two-story,  building contains 23 classrooms including 12 science labs and a performing arts lobby.

In 2017 the Hildebrand Athletic Center was opened. The 67,061 sq ft building supports year-round athletics programs. It includes a 6,800 sq ft weight room, cheer/wrestling room, trophy hallway, and a 4,500 sq ft alumni room with a 1,000 sq ft terrace. It is also home to the Alkek Gym, which is the largest gym in the Southwest Preparatory Conference, holding 1500 spectators.

In November of 2018 the new Underwood Student Center opened its doors. The more than 30,000‑square‑foot building features a dining hall on the first floor with seating for 500, a renovated kitchen and servery, a small raised stage, drop‑down video screen, surround sound, Forrest Place coffee bar, and a glass‑walled art gallery. The second floor features offices for grade‑level deans and two innovation classrooms/STEM labs.

The Four Pillars
The Episcopal High School curriculum is based on Four Pillars:  academics, arts, athletics, and religion.

Academics
The Academic Pillar prepares students for college with its curricula in English, mathematics, science, history, languages, religion, arts, and wellness.  Students may choose from more than 125 courses, including honors-level and Advanced Placement courses. 

Episcopal's language program offers Spanish, French, Chinese, and Latin language and culture. Episcopal's mathematics department teaches classes from algebra 1 to AP statistics. Episcopal's science department, utilizing the labs in the Jack T. Trotter Building, teaches students to analyze data and conduct experiments to better understand the physical world.

Religion
The Religion Pillar includes the daily chapel service attended by all students and faculty, as well as several required courses, including Old Testament, New Testament, World Religions or History of Christianity, and Ethics. Community service is a strong element of the School's mission, and many students participate weekly in projects such as home repair or tutoring disadvantaged students. The Students of Service (SOS) Club is the largest organization on campus.

Arts
The Episcopal arts pillar aims at representing diversity and talent among its students. The theater program runs all year long, producing a musical in the fall and a play in the spring. Students are encouraged to take creative classes such as photography, creative writing and drawing. The school welcomes over 6,000 audience members to shows each year.

Athletics
The Athletics Pillar is supported by the Wellness Department, which offers courses in health education, physical education, wellness, strength and conditioning, and athletic training. The sports program fields 46 teams in 15 sports over three seasons during the school year. These sports are: Football, Volleyball, Cross Country, Field Hockey, Cheerleading, Basketball, Soccer, Wrestling, Swimming, Baseball, Golf, Lacrosse, Tennis, Track & Field, and Softball. More than 75% of the students participate in at least one sport.

Tuition and financial aid
As of 2022-2023, tuition is $32,875 per student per year, plus fees. Financial aid decisions are made separately from and independently of admission decisions. The admission decision is made in advance of the financial aid review, and the Financial Aid Committee has no involvement with a candidate’s being offered a place at Episcopal. The Financial Aid Program is open to students of any race, color, gender, creed, and national or ethnic origin.

Accreditation and memberships
Episcopal High School is accredited by the Independent Schools Association of the Southwest.

Memberships
National Association of Independent Schools
National Association of Episcopal Schools
National Association of Secondary School Principals
National Association of Principals of Schools for Girls
Council for Advancement and Support of Education
Educational Records Bureau
College Board
National Association for College Admission Counseling
Texas Association for College Admission Counseling
Southwest Preparatory Conference

Feeder schools
Episcopal has multiple feeder schools, but the majority of the student body attended River Oaks Baptist School, Annunciation Orthodox School, The Post Oak School, Trafton Academy, or Presbyterian School.

Notable alumni
Jaylen Waddle (Class of 2018), Wide Receiver drafted sixth overall by for the Miami Dolphins in the 2021 NFL Draft
Walker Little (Class of 2017), Offensive tackle drafted 45th overall by the Jacksonville Jaguars in the 2021 NFL Draft. 
Marvin Wilson (Class of 2017), Defensive tackle for the Cleveland Browns and Philadelphia Eagles
Shane Carden (Class of 2010), Quarterback for the East Carolina Pirates and Chicago Bears
Stephanie Styles (Class of 2010), American Broadway and Hollywood actress, singer, and dancer
Becky Bereswill (Class of 2009), American figure skater
Daniel Loper (Class of 2000), Offensive Lineman for the Tennessee Titans, Detroit Lions, Oakland Raiders, and Dallas Cowboys
Spergon Wynn (Class of 1996), Professional Quarterback in NFL NFL Europe CFL
Andrew Friedman (Class of 1995), President of Baseball Operations of the Major League Baseball (MLB) Los Angeles Dodgers, former GM of Tampa Bay Rays
Dena Dubal (Class of 1992), Neuroscientist and physician at the University of California, San Francisco
DeAndre Jordan NBA Player.

See also

 Christianity in Houston

References

External links

 Episcopal High School

Private high schools in Harris County, Texas
Independent Schools Association of the Southwest
Educational institutions established in 1983
Episcopal schools in the United States
Bellaire, Texas
1983 establishments in Texas
Christian schools in Texas